Springer Gabler (formerly Gabler Verlag) is a German publishing house in the fields of economy. It was founded in Wiesbaden in 1929 as Betriebswirtschaftlicher Verlag Doktor Theodor Gabler.

The program is focussed on management, marketing and sales, financial services, controlling and taxes.

Today's Springer Gabler is a result of a merger between Gabler Verlag and Springer-Verlag. It belongs to Springer Science+Business Media.

External links 
 Website of Springer Gabler

References 

Publishing companies of Germany
Publishing companies established in the 1920s
Springer Science+Business Media